This is a list of slang terminology used by Generation Z, or those born roughly between the late 1990s to the late 2000s in the Western world.

Generation Z slang differs significantly from slang terminology of prior generations in history in that Gen Z was the first generation to grow up entirely within the internet age. Due to this, much of their slang originates from online media such as social media apps like TikTok, YouTube, or Twitch. The ease of communication that comes with the internet also results in their slang being proliferated to a greater and swifter extent.

Much of Gen Z slang today was not termed by members of the generation itself but rather were terms already in use by certain communities. In many cases, Gen Z slang is derived from African-American vernacular English and LGBTQ+ slang. This has led to accusations of cultural appropriation.


List

Notes

References 

Lists of slang
Generation Z